The 2004 Mercedes-Benz Cup was the 2004 edition of the Los Angeles Open men's tennis tournament. The tournament was held from July 12, 2004 through July 18, 2004 and total prize money awarded was $380,000. The event was part of the International Series of the 2004 ATP Tour and of the 2004 US Open Series. Unseeded Tommy Haas won the singles title and the accompanying $52,000 first-prize money.

Finals

Singles

 Tommy Haas defeated  Nicolas Kiefer 7–6(8–6), 6–4

Doubles

 Bob Bryan /  Mike Bryan defeated  Wayne Arthurs /  Paul Hanley 6–3, 7–6(8–6)

References 

Mercedes-Benz Cup
Los Angeles Open (tennis)
Mercedes-Benz Cup
Mercedes-Benz Cup
Mercedes-Benz Cup
Mercedes-Benz Cup